Irina Ufimtseva (born 6 January 1985) is a former Olympics freestyle swimmer from Russia. She swam for Russia at the 2000 Olympics where she was part of Russia's tenth place women's 4×200 m freestyle relay. Individually she finished in 17th place in the 400 m and 800 m freestyle.

She had her best results in the 400 m and 800 m freestyle in the 25 m pool: a silver medal at the 2002 World Championships and three medals at European championships in 2000-2001.

References

1985 births
Living people
Russian female freestyle swimmers
Swimmers at the 2000 Summer Olympics
Olympic swimmers of Russia
Sportspeople from Novosibirsk
Medalists at the FINA World Swimming Championships (25 m)
Universiade medalists in swimming
Universiade bronze medalists for Russia
Medalists at the 2003 Summer Universiade